Third precinct police station may refer to:
 Third precinct police station (Detroit) that was formerly on Hunt Street
 Third precinct police station (Minneapolis) that burned down on May 28, 2020 during riots